Coldstream Research Campus, in Lexington, Kentucky, is home to over 50 organizations, many with ties to the University of Kentucky.  Over 2,100 employees work on the 735-acre campus in agricultural biotechnology, pharmaceuticals, equine health, engineering technology, pharmaceutical manufacturing, and software/IT.  Some companies are graduates of ASTeCC, UK's high-tech business incubator, others have licensed UK intellectual property or are clients of the Von Allmen Center for Entrepreneurship.

OpenText, Pirimal Pharma Solutions, Komatsu, Tempur Sealy International, and A&W Restaurants have headquarters or regional offices at Coldstream. Eastern State Hospital, an inpatient psychiatric treatment center and brain injury research center operated by UK HealthCare, opened in September 2013. 
Coldstream Research Campus houses 21 buildings consisting of 1.3 million square feet of floor space.

The current site of the Coldstream Research Campus has historical significance. It was once the McGrathiana Stud, a famous horse farm founded by Price McGrath that had strong ties to Thoroughbred racing. Aristides, a colt bred and raised at McGrathiana won the 1875 inaugural running of the Kentucky Derby for Price McGrath.

See also
 Research park
 Technology centers

References

External links
 Coldstream Research Campus
 University of Kentucky
 UK ASTeCC
 UK Von Allmen Center for Entrepreneurship

Science parks in the United States
Buildings at the University of Kentucky
Economy of Lexington, Kentucky